Route 43 may refer to:

Route 43 (WMATA), a bus route in Washington, D.C.
London Buses route 43

See also
List of highways numbered 43

43